Kari Oftedal Lima (14 December 1943 – 29 May 2019) was a Norwegian politician for the Socialist Left Party.

She served as a deputy representative to the Parliament of Norway from Rogaland during the terms 1993–1997 and 1997–2001. She met during 2 days of parliamentary session.

On the local level she has been a member of Rogaland county council. She is also deputy chair of the board of the Western Norway Regional Health Authority.

She hails from Ålgård.

References

1943 births
2019 deaths
People from Gjesdal
Socialist Left Party (Norway) politicians
Deputy members of the Storting
Rogaland politicians
Women members of the Storting